Alikanna is an unincorporated community in Jefferson County, in the U.S. state of Ohio.

History
Alikanna had its start in 1873 when an iron works was built there. A post office called Alikanna was established in 1889, and was discontinued in 1893. The community's name is an amalgamation of Alexander and Anna, the names of two early settlers.

References

Unincorporated communities in Jefferson County, Ohio
Unincorporated communities in Ohio